The Very Best of Elkie Brooks  is a compilation album by Elkie Brooks issued on CD, vinyl and cassette in 1986 through Telstar Records. It reached number 10 and stayed in the UK charts for 18 weeks.

Track listing 
"Pearl's a Singer"
"Sunshine After the Rain"
"Our Love"
"Dance Away"
"Only Love Can Break Your Heart"
"I Guess That's Why They Call It the Blues"
"The Runaway"
"Fool (If You Think It's Over)"
"Don't Cry Out Loud"
"Superstar"
"Blue Moon"
"Going Back"
"Nights in White Satin"
"Gloria"
"Gasoline Alley"
"Lilac Wine"

1986 compilation albums
Elkie Brooks albums
Telstar Records compilation albums